Econophysics is a heterodox interdisciplinary research field, applying theories and methods originally developed by physicists in order to solve problems in economics, usually those including uncertainty or stochastic processes and nonlinear dynamics. Some of its application to the study of financial markets has also been termed statistical finance referring to its roots in statistical physics. Econophysics is closely related to social physics.

History
Physicists' interest in the social sciences is not new (see e.g.,); Daniel Bernoulli, as an example, was the originator of utility-based preferences. One of the founders of neoclassical economic theory, former Yale University Professor of Economics Irving Fisher, was originally trained under the renowned Yale physicist, Josiah Willard Gibbs. Likewise, Jan Tinbergen, who won the first Nobel Memorial Prize in Economic Sciences in 1969 for having developed and applied dynamic models for the analysis of economic processes, studied physics with Paul Ehrenfest at Leiden University. In particular, Tinbergen developed the gravity model of international trade that has become the workhorse of international economics.

Econophysics was started in the mid-1990s by several physicists working in the subfield of statistical mechanics.  Unsatisfied with the traditional explanations and approaches of economists – which usually prioritized simplified approaches for the sake of soluble theoretical models over agreement with empirical data – they applied tools and methods from physics, first to try to match financial data sets, and then to explain more general economic phenomena.

One driving force behind econophysics arising at this time was the sudden availability of large amounts of financial data, starting in the 1980s.  It became apparent that traditional methods of analysis were insufficient – standard economic methods dealt with homogeneous agents and equilibrium, while many of the more interesting phenomena in financial markets fundamentally depended on heterogeneous agents and far-from-equilibrium situations.

The term "econophysics" was coined by H. Eugene Stanley, to describe the large number of papers written by physicists in the problems of (stock and other) markets, in a conference on statistical physics in Kolkata (erstwhile Calcutta)  in 1995 and first appeared in its proceedings publication in Physica A 1996. The inaugural meeting on econophysics was organised in 1998 in Budapest by János Kertész and Imre Kondor. The first book on econophysics was by R. N. Mantegna & H. E. Stanley in  2000.

The almost regular meeting series on the topic include: ECONOPHYS-KOLKATA (held in Kolkata & Delhi), Econophysics Colloquium, ESHIA/ WEHIA.

In recent years network science, heavily reliant on analogies from statistical mechanics, has been applied to the study of productive systems. That is the case with the works done at the Santa Fe Institute in European Funded Research Projects as Forecasting Financial Crises and the Harvard-MIT Observatory of Economic Complexity

If "econophysics" is taken to denote the principle of applying statistical mechanics to economic analysis, as opposed to a particular literature or network, priority of innovation is probably due to Emmanuel Farjoun and Moshé Machover (1983). Their book Laws of Chaos: A Probabilistic Approach to Political Economy proposes dissolving (their words) the transformation problem in Marx's political economy by re-conceptualising the relevant quantities as random variables.

If, on the other hand, "econophysics" is taken to denote the application of physics to
economics, one can consider the works of Léon Walras and Vilfredo Pareto as part of it. Indeed, as shown by Bruna Ingrao and Giorgio Israel, general equilibrium theory in economics is based on the physical concept of mechanical equilibrium.

Econophysics has nothing to do with the "physical quantities approach" to economics, advocated by Ian Steedman and others associated with neo-Ricardianism. Notable econophysicists are Jean-Philippe Bouchaud, Giulio Bottazzi, Bikas K Chakrabarti, J. Doyne Farmer, Tiziana Di Matteo, Diego Garlaschelli, Dirk Helbing, János Kertész, Rosario N. Mantegna, Matteo Marsili, Joseph L. McCauley, Enrico Scalas, Angelo Secchi, Didier Sornette, H. Eugene Stanley, Victor Yakovenko and Yi-Cheng Zhang.  Particularly noteworthy among the formal courses on econophysics is the one offered by Diego Garlaschelli at the Physics Department of the Leiden University. From September 2014 King's College London has awarded the first position of Full Professor in Econophysics (Tiziana Di Matteo).

Basic tools

Basic tools of econophysics are probabilistic and statistical methods often taken from statistical physics.

Physics models that have been applied in economics include the kinetic theory of gas (called the kinetic exchange models of markets), percolation models, chaotic models developed to study cardiac arrest, and models with self-organizing criticality as well as other models developed for earthquake prediction. Moreover, there have been attempts to use the mathematical theory of complexity and information theory, as developed by many scientists among whom are Murray Gell-Mann and Claude E. Shannon, respectively.

For potential games, it has been shown that an emergence-producing equilibrium based on information via Shannon information entropy produces the same equilibrium measure (Gibbs measure from statistical mechanics) as a stochastic dynamical equation which represents noisy decisions, both of which are based on bounded rationality models used by economists. The fluctuation-dissipation theorem connects the two to establish a concrete correspondence of "temperature", "entropy", "free potential/energy", and other physics notions to an economics system.  The statistical mechanics model is not constructed a-priori - it is a result of a boundedly rational assumption and modeling on existing neoclassical models.  It has been used to prove the "inevitability of collusion" result of Huw Dixon in a case for which the neoclassical version of the model does not predict collusion. Here the demand is increasing, as with Veblen goods, stock buyers with the "hot hand" fallacy preferring to buy more successful stocks and sell those that are less successful, or among short traders during a short squeeze as occurred with the WallStreetBets group's collusion to drive up GameStop stock price in 2021.

Quantifiers derived from information theory were used in several papers by econophysicist Aurelio F. Bariviera and coauthors in order to assess the degree in the informational efficiency of stock markets. Zunino et al. use an innovative statistical tool in the financial literature: the complexity-entropy causality plane. This Cartesian representation establish an efficiency ranking of different markets and distinguish different bond market dynamics. It was found that more developed countries have stock markets with higher entropy and lower complexity, while those markets from emerging countries have lower entropy and higher complexity. Moreover, the authors conclude that the classification derived from the complexity-entropy causality plane is consistent with the qualifications assigned by major rating companies to the sovereign instruments. A similar study developed by Bariviera et al. explore the relationship between credit ratings and informational efficiency of a sample of corporate bonds of US oil and energy companies using also the complexity–entropy causality plane. They find that this classification agrees with the credit ratings assigned by Moody's.

Another good example is random matrix theory, which can be used to identify the noise in financial correlation matrices.  One paper has argued that this technique can improve the performance of portfolios, e.g., in applied in portfolio optimization.

There are, however, various other tools from physics that have so far been used, such as fluid dynamics, classical mechanics and quantum mechanics (including so-called classical economy, quantum economics and quantum finance), and the path integral formulation of statistical mechanics.

There are also analogies between finance theory and diffusion theory. For instance, the Black–Scholes equation for option pricing is a diffusion-advection equation (see however  for a critique of the Black–Scholes methodology). The Black–Scholes theory can be extended to provide an analytical theory of main factors in economic activities.

Influence

Papers on econophysics have been published primarily in journals devoted to physics and statistical mechanics, rather than in leading economics journals. Some Mainstream economists have generally been unimpressed by this work. Other economists, including Mauro Gallegati, Steve Keen, Paul Ormerod, and Alan Kirman have shown more interest, but also criticized some trends in econophysics. On the other hand, Nobel laureate and founder of experimental economics Vernon L. Smith has used econophysics to model sociability via implementation of ideas in Humanomics.

Econophysics is having some impacts on the more applied field of quantitative finance, whose scope and aims significantly differ from those of economic theory. Various econophysicists have introduced models for price fluctuations in physics of financial markets or original points of view on established models.

Main results
Presently, one of the main results of econophysics comprises the explanation of the "fat tails" in the distribution of many kinds of financial data as a universal self-similar scaling property (i.e. scale invariant over many orders of magnitude in the data), arising from the tendency of individual market competitors, or of aggregates of them, to exploit systematically and optimally the prevailing "microtrends" (e.g., rising or falling prices). These "fat tails" are not only mathematically important, because they comprise the  risks, which may be on the one hand, very small such that one may tend to neglect them, but which - on the other hand - are not negligible at all, i.e. they can never be made exponentially tiny, but instead follow a measurable algebraically decreasing power law, for example with a failure probability of only  where x is an increasingly large variable  in the tail region of the distribution considered (i.e. a price statistics with much more than 108 data). I.e., the events considered are not simply "outliers" but must really be taken into account and cannot be "insured away". It appears that it also plays a role that near a change of the tendency (e.g. from falling to rising prices) there are typical "panic reactions" of the selling or buying agents with algebraically increasing bargain rapidities and volumes.

As in quantum field theory the "fat tails" can be obtained by complicated "nonperturbative" methods, mainly by numerical ones, since they contain the deviations from the usual Gaussian approximations, e.g. the Black–Scholes theory.  Fat tails can, however, also be due to other phenomena, such as a random number of terms in the central-limit theorem, or any number of other, non-econophysics models. Due to the difficulty in testing such models, they have received less attention in traditional economic analysis.

See also

 Bose–Einstein condensation (network theory)
 Potential game
 Complexity economics
 Complex network
 Detrended fluctuation analysis
 Kinetic exchange models of markets
 Long-range dependency
 Network theory
 Network science
 Thermoeconomics
 Quantum finance
 Sznajd model

References

Further reading
 Rosario N. Mantegna, H. Eugene Stanley, An Introduction to Econophysics: Correlations and Complexity in Finance, Cambridge University Press (Cambridge, UK, 1999)
Sitabhra Sinha, Arnab Chatterjee, Anirban Chakraborti, Bikas K Chakrabarti. Econophysics: An Introduction,  Wiley-VCH (2010)
 Bikas K Chakrabarti, Anirban Chakraborti, Arnab Chatterjee, Econophysics and Sociophysics : Trends and Perspectives, Wiley-VCH, Berlin (2006)
Joseph McCauley, Dynamics of Markets, Econophysics and Finance, Cambridge University Press (Cambridge, UK, 2004)
 Bertrand Roehner, Patterns of Speculation - A Study in Observational Econophysics, Cambridge University Press (Cambridge, UK, 2002)
 Surya Y., Situngkir, H., Dahlan, R. M., Hariadi, Y., Suroso, R. (2004). Aplikasi Fisika dalam Analisis Keuangan (Physics Applications in Financial Analysis. Bina Sumber Daya MIPA. 
 Arnab Chatterjee, Sudhakar Yarlagadda, Bikas K Chakrabarti, Econophysics of Wealth Distributions, Springer-Verlag Italia (Milan, 2005)
 Philip Mirowski, More Heat than Light - Economics as Social Physics, Physics as Nature's Economics, Cambridge University Press (Cambridge, UK, 1989)
 Ubaldo Garibaldi and Enrico Scalas, Finitary Probabilistic Methods in Econophysics, Cambridge University Press (Cambridge, UK, 2010).
 Emmanual Farjoun and Moshé Machover,  Laws of Chaos: a probabilistic approach to political economy, Verso (London, 1983) 
 Marcelo Byrro Ribeiro, Income Distribution Dynamics of Economic Systems: An Econophysical Approach, Cambridge University Press (Cambridge, UK, 2020).
 Nature Physics Focus issue: Complex networks in finance March 2013 Volume 9 No 3 pp 119–128
 Mark Buchanan, What has econophysics ever done for us?, Nature 2013 
 Martin Shubik and Eric Smith, The Guidance of an Enterprise Economy, MIT Press,  MIT Press (2016)
  Abergel, F., Aoyama, H., Chakrabarti, B.K., Chakraborti, A., Deo, N., Raina, D., Vodenska, I. (Eds.), Econophysics and Sociophysics: Recent Progress and Future Directions, New Economic Windows Series, Springer (2017)
 Anatoly V. Kondratenko. Physical Modeling of Economic Systems. Classical and Quantum Economies. Novosibirsk, Nauka (Science) (2005), ; Probabilistic Theory of Stock Exchanges. Novosibirsk, Nauka (Science) (2021),

Lectures
 Economic Fluctuations and Statistical Physics: Quantifying Extremely Rare and Much Less Rare Events, Eugene Stanley,  Videolectures.net
 Applications of Statistical Physics to Understanding Complex Systems, Eugene Stanley, Videolectures.net
 Financial Bubbles, Real Estate Bubbles, Derivative Bubbles, and the Financial and Economic Crisis, Didier Sornette,  Videolectures.net
 Financial crises and risk management, Didier Sornette,  Videolectures.net
 Bubble trouble: how physics can quantify stock-market crashes, Tobias Preis,  Physics World Online Lecture Series 
 An Elementary Humanomics Approach to Boundedly Rational Potential Games, Michael J. Campbell and Vernon L. Smith, Harvard Growth Lab

External links
 Is Inequality Inevitable?; Scientific American, November 2019
 When Physics Became Undisciplined (& Fathers of Econophysics): Cambridge University Thesis (2018)
 Conference to mark 25th anniversary of Farjoun and Machover's book
 Econophysics Colloquium

Applied and interdisciplinary physics
Mathematical finance
Schools of economic thought
Statistical mechanics
Interdisciplinary subfields of economics